Marc Zwiebler (born 13 March 1984) is a badminton player from Germany. His highest ranking is 10 in the world. He is a seven-time German national champion in men's singles. He won gold at the 2012 European Championships in Karlskrona over Henri Hurskainen 21–15, 21–13. 2010 he won bronze behind Peter Gade and Jan Ø. Jørgensen. By reaching the third round at the 2008 Olympics and the final of 2009 Denmark Open, one of premier tournament competition series BWF World Superseries, Zwiebler is considered as Germany's top badminton player of all time.

Badminton career 
Zwiebler started at the age of six years to play badminton. Soon, he was regarded as the biggest German talent. He was 19 times German youth and junior champion in 2003 he became European junior champion and won his first international title at the senior.

In 2005, he was plagued by pain in the back, he thought was ordinary sore muscles until the pain had worsened significantly and he could no longer play just before Christmas 2005. With the diagnosis of herniated disc, his career was in jeopardy and thus moved  his dream of participating at the 2008 Olympics in Beijing in further distance. After an operation in late 2006 and six months of rehabilitation and fitness training with a total of one and a half year absence, he started to chase after the Olympic qualification. After the enforced break, he was given no more in the world ranking, but within eight months he fought his way, including six European Badminton Circuit titles in 27th place in the world ranking and gave themselves enough to make participation in the Olympics.

At the 2008 Olympics, Zwiebler beat Ireland's Scott Evans in the first round and England's Andrew Smith in the second round, each in three sets. As the first German player ever he went there one last sixteen, but lost to South Korea's Lee Hyun-il 13–21, 23–25.

At 2009 World Championships in Hyderabad, he lost to Kenichi Tago in the second round 15–21, 10–21.

At 2009 Denmark Open, Zwiebler defeated the number four seeded Malaysia's Wong Choong Hann in the first round in three sets. It was followed by a victory over his unseeded compatriot Muhammad Hafiz Hashim in three sets before he won against the number eight seeded China's Chen Long in two sets. In the semifinals, he finally won over the reigning World Cup bronze medalist and runner-up of 2007 Indonesia's Sony Dwi Kuncoro  in three sets. He became the first ever German to reach the final of a Super Series tournament in Denmark, but lost to Indonesia's Simon Santoso 14–21, 6–21.

At prestigious 2011 All England, Zwiebler beat the reigning world champion China's Chen Jin 21–18, 22–20 in the second round, but  was defeated in the semifinals by the 2008 Olympic champion and four-time world champion, China's Lin Dan 9–21, 21–16, 11–21.

He also steered Germany into the semi-finals of the 2010 European Men's Team Championships, where they lost to eventual champions Denmark. Later that year, he gained a bronze medal at the European Championships after losing to Peter Gade in the semifinals in a thrilling match 21–18, 12–21, 17–21.

In July 2011, Zwiebler won the Canada Open and thus his first BWF Grand Prix title. In the final he beat the 2004 Olympic champion and 2005 world champion Taufik Hidayat 21–13, 25–23.

In April 2017, Zwiebler announced his retirement on his personal Facebook page. He stated that the European Championships, Sudirman Cup, Thailand Open, Indonesia Open, and 2017 BWF World Championships will be his last tournaments.

Results

Men's singles

BWF Super Series (Premier)

Germany national team

References

External links
 
 
 Match overview at highest professional Badminton league in Germany

1984 births
Living people
German male badminton players
Olympic badminton players of Germany
Badminton players at the 2008 Summer Olympics
Badminton players at the 2012 Summer Olympics
Badminton players at the 2016 Summer Olympics
Sportspeople from Bonn